The 1927 North Carolina Tar Heels football team represented the University of North Carolina in the 1927 college football season. The Tar Heels defeated Davidson College 27-0 in the inaugural game at Kenan Memorial Stadium.

Schedule

References

North Carolina
North Carolina Tar Heels football seasons
North Carolina Tar Heels football